Strelka is a rural locality (a village) in Vostrovskoye Rural Settlement, Nyuksensky District, Vologda Oblast, Russia. The population was 2 as of 2002.

Geography 
Strelka is located 72 km northeast of Nyuksenitsa (the district's administrative centre) by road. Pustyn is the nearest rural locality.

References 

Rural localities in Nyuksensky District